The Most Rev. Thomas David Somerville (November 11, 1915 – July 25, 2011) was the sixth Bishop of New Westminster and eighth Metropolitan of British Columbia.

Somerville was born in Lytton, British Columbia and educated at the King George Secondary School and the University of British Columbia in Vancouver.  Ordained in 1939, he had incumbencies in Princeton, Sardis and Vancouver. He was Dean of Residence at the Anglican Theological College of British Columbia then Coadjutor Bishop of New Westminster and then its diocesan and Metropolitan of British Columbia from 1975, retiring from both positions in 1980.

References

1915 births
King George Secondary School alumni
University of British Columbia alumni
Officers of the Order of the British Empire
Anglican bishops of New Westminster
20th-century Anglican Church of Canada bishops
20th-century Anglican archbishops
Metropolitans of British Columbia
2011 deaths